Binn idir an Dá Log (Irish for "peak between the two hollows"), sometimes anglicized Benadolug, at , is the highest of the Maumturk Mountains in Connemara in County Galway, Ireland. It is at the middle of the long north-west to south-east central spine of the range. The summit is the 87th-highest peak in Ireland on the Arderin list, and the 108th-highest on the Vandeleur-Lynam list.

Naming

Binn idir an Dá Log derives its name from the two glacial corries that bound each end of its high rocky summit ridge (the north-western corrie is a lake). The Placenames Database of Ireland records an  anglicised version, 'Benadolug', but this does not appear in other noted Irish mountain placename reference guides.

The mountain has an unnamed southeastern peak. On its slopes is the townland of Barrslievenaroy. Sometimes this name is mistakenly given to Binn idir an Dá Log.

Geography

Binn idir an dá Log lies at the centre of the long north-west to south-east central spine of the Maumturks range in the Connemara National Park.

The col between Binn idir an dá Log and Knocknahillion is the pass of Maumahoge (and the corrie lake is called Lough Maumahoge.

Binn idir an dá Log's prominence of  qualifies it as a P600, and a Marilyn, and it also ranks it as the 52nd-highest mountain in Ireland on the MountainViews Online Database, 100 Highest Irish Mountains, where the minimum prominence threshold is 100 metres.

Hill walking

The easiest way summit Binn idir an dá Log is a 6-kilometre 3-hour route via the pass of Maumahoge; however, because of its positioning on the high rocky central spine of the central Maumturk range, it is also summited in a longer 13-kilometre 5-6 hour loop-route starting at the col of Maumeen , in the south, climbing Binn Chaonaigh and then onto the top of Binn idir an dá Log, before descending via Maumahoge, and walking back.

Binn idir an dá Log is also climbed as part of the Maamturks Challenge, a 25-kilometre 10–12 hour walk over the full Maumturks range (from Maam Cross to Leenaun), which is considered one of the "great classic ridge-walks of Ireland", but of "extreme grade" due to the circa 7,600 feet of total ascent.

Since 1975, the University College Galway Mountaineering Club, has run the annual "Maamturks Challenge Walk" (MCW), and man two checkpoints on Binn idir an dá Log; one at the summit (the summit marks 54% of MCW climbing completed), and another at Lough Maumahoge (the Lough marks 63% of MCW climbing, and 51% of MCW distance, completed), which has a 2pm cut-off time for participants.

Rock climbing

While the Maumturks range is not particularly known for rock climbing routes (unlike Bencorr and its Carrot Ridge spur, across the Inagh Valley), some have been developed at a crag just below and west of Lough Maumahoge (L876 532), with routes of 90 to 190 metres at climbing grades of S to HVS.

Gallery

Bibliography

See also

Twelve Bens, major range in Connemara
Mweelrea, major range in Killary Harbour
Lists of mountains in Ireland
Lists of mountains and hills in the British Isles
List of P600 mountains in the British Isles
List of Marilyns in the British Isles
List of Hewitt mountains in England, Wales and Ireland

References

External links
The Maamturks Challenge, University College Galway Mountaineering Club
The Maamturks Challenge: Routecard (2015)
MountainViews: The Irish Mountain Website, Binn idir an dá Log
MountainViews: Irish Online Mountain Database
The Database of British and Irish Hills , the largest database of British Isles mountains ("DoBIH")
Hill Bagging UK & Ireland, the searchable interface for the DoBIH

Marilyns of Ireland
Hewitts of Ireland
Mountains and hills of County Galway
Mountains under 1000 metres
Climbing areas of Ireland